Cheila is a Venezuelan tragicomedy film directed by Eduardo Barberena based on the theatrical play La Quinta Dayana written by Elio Palencia. It was first premiered at the 2009 Mérida Film Festival receiving the Best Movie and other five awards  it was then released in theaters on 16 July 2010.

Plot
Cheila is a transsexual who has come back from Canada to spend holidays at the quinta she bought for her mother years ago, seeking family support before undergoing her sexual reassignment surgery. Upon her arrival she finds the once luxurious house completely deteriorated and inhabited by her lazy and unemployed brothers with their wives and children.  The financial problems and chaotic situations surrounding her relatives make her reconsider her relationship with them and herself.

The movie uses flashbacks to show Cheila's experiences when she was Cheíto.

Cast
Endry Cardeño as Cheila
José Manuel Suárez as Cheíto
Violeta Alemán as Maíta
Aura Rivas as Abuela
Elodie Bernardeau as Katy
Luke Grande as Bachaco
Nelson Acosta as Guicho
Freddy Aquino as Dayán
Patricia Pacheco as Noreidis

See also
List of Venezuelan films
List of lesbian, gay, bisexual or transgender-related films

References

External links
 

2009 LGBT-related films
2009 films
2000s Spanish-language films
Tragicomedy films
Venezuelan LGBT-related films
Films about trans women